Anwar Hossain (born 1 March 1955) is a Bangladesh Awami League politician and a former Jatiya Sangsad member representing the Pirojpur-3 constituency.

References

Living people
1955 births
Awami League politicians
9th Jatiya Sangsad members
Place of birth missing (living people)